Théo Le Normand (born 8 August 2000) is a French professional footballer who plays as a midfielder for Guingamp.

Career
Le Normand is a youth product of the academy of Guingamp since 2013, and was promoted to their reserves in 2019. On 4 June 2021, he signed his first professional contract with the club. He made his professional debut with the senior Guingamp side in a 3–0 Ligue 2 loss to Amiens on 22 January 2022.

Personal life
Le Normand's older brother, Robin, is a professional footballer for Real Sociedad.

References

External links
 

2000 births
Living people
Sportspeople from Rennes
French footballers
Association football midfielders
En Avant Guingamp players
US Avranches players
Ligue 2 players
Championnat National players
Championnat National 2 players
Championnat National 3 players